Ernestinovo is a municipality in Osijek-Baranja County, Croatia.

The municipality of Ernestinovo was founded in 1884, before that Ernestinovo was part of the municipality of Čepin.

There are a total of 2,189 inhabitants, 78% of whom are Croats, 19% are Hungarians, and 7% are Serbs.
The municipality consists of the settlements of Divoš (pop. 63), Ernestinovo (pop. 1,047), and Laslovo (pop. 1,079).

Ernestinovo also has some people of German descent, although most of the German inhabitants were expelled in 1944.

North of Ernestinovo lies the major HEP Substation TS Ernestinovo, which was originally built in 1977 as the first 400 kV station in Croatia. It is connected with long-distance power lines to TS Tumbri/Žerjavinec (Zagreb) and Pécs, Hungary. It had been destroyed in the Croatian War of Independence in 1991, but was fully repaired in 2003.  Bobota Canal passes next to the village.

Ernestinovo is underdeveloped municipality which is statistically classified as the First Category Area of Special State Concern by the Government of Croatia.

References

Municipalities of Croatia